Serra Negra is a municipality in the state of São Paulo, Brazil. It belongs to the meso-region of Campinas. Population (2020) was 29,452 inhabitants. Total area: 203,5 km2, demographic density: 112 inhabitants/km2

Location

The name of the city means black mountain range in the Portuguese language. It is located at an altitude of 925 m, in the Serra da Mantiqueira, a mountain range which runs mostly along the border of the state of São Paulo and Minas Gerais. It has a mild climate, being also a busy tourism spot, similarly to its close neighbours, the cities of Lindóia and Águas de Lindóia.

History
Serra Negra was founded on 23 September 1828, but at least a century before that the region was already inhabited and was on the passageway between São Paulo and Minas Gerais. It was elevated to the status of city on 21 April 1885. At the end of the 19th century, the region received a large influx of European immigrants, mostly Italians, who came to work on coffee farms. Mineral water sources were discovered by Luiz Rielli in 1928 and the city became a much sought-after spa town (it is known as the "City of Health").

Population history

References

External links
  Official site
  SerraNegra.Com
  hoteisdeserranegra.com.br

Populated places established in 1828
Municipalities in São Paulo (state)